Wildenhain is a village and a former municipality in the district of Meißen, in Saxony, Germany. Since 1 October 2009, it is part of the town Großenhain.

References

Former municipalities in Saxony
Meissen (district)